Strike Commando is a 1987 Vietnam war action film directed by Bruno Mattei and starring Reb Brown, Christopher Connelly and Alex Vitale.

A sequel, Strike Commando II (Trappola diabolica), was released in 1988 and stars Brent Huff as Sgt. Michael Ransom.

Plot
Sgt. Michael Ransom (Brown) and his team of "Strike Commandos" are sneaking into a Vietnamese base, who are planning to lay explosives. Colonel Radek and Ransom's majors watch from a nearby vantage point. All prove to be successful, until one of the commandos is caught and killed by a sentry, rising the alarm. The commandos have no choice but to retreat, but Colonel Radek who is in charge of the mission demands the explosives be set off as the commandos are still retreating. One of the explosives kill one of Ransom's soldiers as he retreats, and Ransom is blown into a river.

Ransom drifts unconscious in the river until he is found by a village boy, who treat and nurse him back to health. He speaks with Le Due (Pigozzi) a retired French soldier who says the village used to be a church until the Viet Cong kept attacking. Ransom also learns that there is a Russian presence in Vietnam. Ransom agrees to take the Vietnamese village people to safety in an unknown location. As they come across a decomposed dead soldier who has a radio, Ransom calls his home base and tells his commander that he's alive and where he could be picked up. However, he also says that the Strike team demands justice and that he will strike vengeance. Radek sends a helicopter to retrieve Ransom at a specific spot. Ransom and the village people make camp, as Ransom talks to the village boy who saved him about the wonders of America and Disneyland.

The next day, the group run into resistance while trying to cross a river, and are shot down by a nearby patrol boat. Ransom decides to go into the river and take down the boat. However, the group is flanked by a group of VC's who are taken down by Le Due with a grenade. Ransom dumps a huge amount of grenades into the boat and kills everyone in the patrol boat.

Later, the village people still make their retreat out of the jungle. While Le Due stops to catch his breath he is caught and choked to death by a Russian soldier. Ransom finds the corpse of Le Due and finds a Russian patch symbol torn from the soldiers uniform. The Russian soldiers are in search of the village people as Ransom kills them off one by one. Ransom soon discovers, however, that there are too many and that he must retreat. Radek commands the helicopter to retreat to base, but Ransom's major is able to talk the soldier into picking him up anyway. Ransom's major is able to calm Ransom so much so that Ransom volunteers to go back to take pictures of the base so that there will be proof of Russian presence in Vietnam.

Ransom goes back to Vietnam but finds the village people have been slaughtered. Ransom finds the village boy that helped him in the beginning as he is dying. Ransom tells him more things about the amazing Disneyland, just as he dies. Ransom finds the name of the Russian soldier, Jakoda, and seeks revenge. Ransom mugs a VC and he tells him where to find Jakoda. Ransom, enraged, fires at the village with his stolen M60 machine gun. Jakoda finds Ransom reloading the weapon, but he is able to talk Ransom into surrendering by holding a civilian hostage. Ransom's superiors find out that there are Russians in there and that now he is going to be tortured. They brutally torture Ransom by having him do exhausting yard work for hours, beating him, electrifying him, and burning his back with a blow torch. After spending months in a cell with a corpse, Ransom breaks and agrees to make a demoralizing radio broadcast. However, he is able to get the best of the Russian soldiers and kills them. Ransom takes Jakoda's girlfriend Olga (Kamteeg) hostage, he is able to kill some of the soldiers using Olga as bait. He then radios Radek to bring another chopper to pick him up, and he kills more of the soldiers. When Ransom and Olga reach the pick up point, Olga says that they will not pick up Ransom but attempt to kill him. The helicopter flies by but kills Olga and almost kills Ransom. Ransom is able to gun down one of the gunmen and the helicopter retreats. Ransom then comes across an army boat and dives in to go kill some more soldiers. A VC sneaks up on him and strangles him, but Ransom is able to stab him and dives out when the ship explodes.

Ransom comes back to the shore and kills a Russian soldier, but Jakoda boots him in the head and challenges Ransom in a fight. Ransom and Jakoda brutally beat each other until Ransom gets the best of Jakoda and propels him into a waterfall, possibly killing him. Ransom yells in triumph.

Ransom is able to find his way back to base and is enraged and looking for Radek. He fires at Radek's office. But Ransom's major says that Radek has gone AWOL. However, one of the generals finds out where Radek is hiding.

Ransom finds out that Radek has actually become an importer/exporter in Manila. Ransom arrives at the building where Radek is, and goes to the front desk lady. He then lays a 2-minute grenade on the ash tray on the desk. The lady then alerts all the people. Ransom roams the halls of the building using his M60 and mows down all the men. He then loads a grenade on his gun and fires at Radek, blowing him up.

Ransom then leaves the building, but he finds that Jakoda is back and that he has got a pair of metal teeth from their last fight. Jakoda tackles Ransom, but Ransom puts a grenade in Jakoda's mouth; Ransom runs and Jakoda explodes, leaving only his metal teeth behind and the echo of Jadoka screaming, Amerikanski!.

Cast
 Reb Brown as Michael Ransom
 Christopher Connelly as Colonel Radek
 Alex Vitale as Jakoda, the main antagonist of the film
 Mike Monty as Maj. Harriman
 Luciano Pigozzi Le Due
 Louise Kamsteeg as Olga
 James Gaines as Radek's soldier
 Edison Navarro as Lao
 Karen Lopez as Cho-Li

Release
Strike Commando was distributed in October 1987 in the United States with a 102 minute running time. The film received a token theatrical release in Kansas City ahead of its home video release in the United States.

In 2021, the film was released on Blu-ray in the United States, along with its sequel, Strike Commando 2. It was distributed by Severin Films.

Reception
The film was reviewed by a critic credited as "Lor." in Variety who reviewed the International Video Entertainment video cassette. "Lor." described the film as a "run-of-the-mill Italian war picture imitating Rambo."  "Lor." went on to discuss "dumb dialog" and that the film was "at least a reel or two overlong, film has an idiotic, padded coda set about 15 years later in Manila." The review went on to note that "Some okay minor action scenes do not disguise the face the film lacks the large-scale set pieces that have become de rigueur for Vietnam war pics."

References

Sources

External links
 
 Strike Commando at Variety Distribution

1987 films
1980s action war films
Italian action films
English-language Italian films
Films directed by Bruno Mattei
Films scored by Luigi Ceccarelli
Vietnam War films
Cold War films
Macaroni Combat films
1987 action films
1980s exploitation films
1980s English-language films
1980s Italian films
Italian films about revenge
Films critical of communism